Oscar or Óscar  Gómez may refer to:

 Óscar Rendoll Gómez (born 1916), Chilean football manager
 Óscar Gómez Sánchez (born 1934), Peruvian footballer
 Oscar R. Gómez (born 1956), Argentine writer, psychoanalyst and academic researcher 
 Óscar Gómez Barbero (born 1961), corporate director of Information Systems at RENFE, the Spanish state railways
 Oscar Gómez (boxer) (born 1975), Argentine boxer
 Óscar Freire Gómez (born 1976), a former Spanish road bicycle racer
 Oscar Gomez (activist) (died 1994) Mexican-American student activist